Soul People is an album by American saxophonists Sonny Stitt and Booker Ervin, and organist Don Patterson. Just like his previous Soul Shack, Soul People features heavily blues-drenched jazz. The original album was recorded in 1964 and issued by Prestige in early 1965. In 1993, it was reissued on CD by Prestige, featuring three additional tracks.

Track listing
Original LP

"Soul People" (Stitt) - 9:59
"Sonny's Book" (Stitt) - 8:57
""C" Jam Blues" (Ellington) - 10:00
"Medley: I Can't Get Started/The Masquerade Is Over" (Vernon Duke, Ira Gershwin/Herb Magidson, Allie Wrubel)- 11:16

Bonus tracks on CD reissue:
"Flying Home" (Goodman, Hampton, Robin) - 10:13
"Tune-Up (Davis) - 4:26
"There Will Never Be Another You" (Gordon, Warren) - 7:53

Tracks 1-5 recorded August 25, 1964; #6 on September 15, 1969; #7 on August 5, 1966. Tracks 5-6 previously issued on Don Patterson's Tune Up! (PR 7852).

Personnel
Tracks 1-5
Sonny Stitt - alto saxophone 2 and 4 tenor saxophone 1,3 and 5
Booker Ervin - tenor saxophone
Don Patterson - organ
Billy James - drums

Track 6
Sonny Stitt - alto saxophone
Don Patterson - organ
Grant Green - guitar
Billy James - drums

Track 7
Don Patterson - organ
Vinnie Corrao - guitar
Billy James - drums

References

Prestige Records albums
Sonny Stitt albums
1965 albums
Albums recorded at Van Gelder Studio
Albums produced by Ozzie Cadena